Cock of the Air is a 1932 American pre-Code aviation comedy film directed by Tom Buckingham and written by Charles Lederer and Robert E. Sherwood. The film stars Chester Morris, Billie Dove, Matt Moore, Walter Catlett and Luis Alberni. Cock of the Air was released on January 23, 1932, by United Artists.

The film was restored by the Academy Film Archive in 2016.

Plot
Parisian cabaret performer Lilli de Rousseau (Billie Dove),  performing as Jean d'Arc on stage, is asked to leave the country by several diplomats as she is a distraction to high-ranking officers. She is set up with a villa in Italy, and Captain Tonnino (Luis Alberni) as her guardian.  Lilli is also smitten by Lieutenant Roger Craig (Chester Morris) who has a reputation as a "Don Juan". She keeps her identity a secret from Roger, and begins to woo him, but remains elusive.

When her understudy in Paris begins getting accolades, Lilli presses Roger to take her there for a drink at the Ritz, although she has been forbidden to return. Roger risks arrest and his military career to fly her and his mechanic, Terry (Matt Moore), to Paris. After a night on the town, Roger is afraid he will be picked up by the MPs, as he is absent without leave.

Terry is arrested for disorderly conduct and impersonating an officer, but is released and learns that the MPS will also drop charges against Roger. Lilli performs again as Jean d'Arc and tells Roger to join her at the theater. After she receives an ovation, she admits she promised to return to Italy in exchange for keeping Roger out of jail, and accepts Roger's marriage proposal.

Cast

 Chester Morris as Lt. Roger Craig
 Billie Dove as Lilli de Rosseau
 Matt Moore as Terry
 Walter Catlett as Colonel Wallace
 Luis Alberni as Captain Tonnino
 Kathryn Sergava as Italian girl #1 
 Yola d'Avril as Italian girl #2
 Vivien Oakland as Irate Woman in Restaurant
 Émile Chautard as French Ambassador
 Ethel Kenyon as Lilli's Companion 
 Peggy Watts as Lilli's Maid

Production
Principal photography for Cock of the Air took place first from mid-September to early October 1931. The primary location for the production was the Metropolitan Airport in Van Nuys, California where the remaining aircraft from the earlier Hell's Angels (1930), a total of 14 World War I-era  and later aircraft, were assembled.

In order to recoup some of the investment made in Hell's Angels, Howard Hughes decided to recycle some of the sequences and unused footage for a pair of comedies set in the air, Sky Devils (1932) and the Cock of the Air.  "The picture contained little air action ..." 

During production, Hughes and his chief pilot, Frank Clarke were at odds over Clarke's romantic involvement on the set with Billie Dove, a former flame of Hughes. The resulting friction between Hughes and Clarke, and later all the pilots in the film, led to the formation of Association of Motion Picture Pilots Union that campaigned for improved working conditions.

Final release of the film was held up with re-editing scenes to comply with violations of the Motion Picture Production Code. Ultimately, changes were made, although the suggestive title was left intact.

Reception
Reviewer Mordaunt Hall at The New York Times, described the film as "This wild tale springs from the pens of Robert E. Sherwood and Charles Lederer, with some jabs of fun inserted by Tom Buckingham, the director. Howard Hughes, producer of "Hell's Angels," is chiefly responsible for the offering, which stirred up many a hearty laugh from an audience yesterday afternoon. There was a loud outburst of mirth when Craig, played by Chester Morris, squirts a seltzer syphon at Lilli, impersonated by Billie Dove. A second or so later further merriment was elicited when Lilli slaps Craig's face with a most convenient pancake. Assuredly it is a film which conveys surprises, for the unexpected invariably happens."

The review in the TV Guide noted: "Pleasant romantic comedy that uses its nationality-bonding thematics in a heartfelt way. Dove, who had had a brief affair with millionaire producer Hughes –he had even paid for her divorce from director Irving Willat in 1931 – was rewarded for her affections with a lead in this film<ref>"Cock Of The Air." TV Guide. Retrieved: June 8, 2016.</ref>

References
Notes

Citations

Bibliography

 Orriss, Bruce W. When Hollywood Ruled the Skies: The Aviation Film Classics of World War I. Los Angeles: Aero Associates, 2013. .
 Paris, Michael. From the Wright Brothers to Top gun: Aviation, Nationalism, and Popular Cinema. Manchester, UK: Manchester University Press, 1995. . 
 Pendo, Stephen. Aviation in the Cinema''. Lanham, Maryland: Scarecrow Press, 1985. .

External links
 
 

1932 films
1932 comedy films
American aviation films
American comedy films
Films produced by Howard Hughes
Films directed by Tom Buckingham
American black-and-white films
1930s American films
1930s English-language films